David Dumars (born January 21, 1957) is a former American football defensive back who played three seasons in the United States Football League with the Denver Gold and Birmingham Stallions. He was drafted by the New York Jets in the twelfth round of the 1980 NFL Draft. He played college football at the Northeast Louisiana University and attended Natchitoches Central High School in Natchitoches, Louisiana.

Early years
Dumars played high school football and basketball for the Natchitoches Central High School Chiefs. He is an older brother of Joe Dumars, who played professional basketball for the Detroit Pistons of the NBA.

College career
Dumars played for the Northeast Louisiana Indians from 1975 to 1979. He first played wide receiver for the Indians before converting to defensive back.

Professional career
Dumars was selected by the New York Jets with the 317th pick of the twelfth round in the 1980 NFL Draft. He played for the Montreal Alouettes from 1980 to 1981. He was a member of the New York Jets during the 1982 off-season. He was released by the team on September 7, 1982. He played for the Denver Gold from 1983 to 1984. He played for the Birmingham Stallions in 1985.

Coaching career
Dumars began his coaching career for Tallulah High School in Tallulah, Louisiana in 1987. He served as defensive backs coach for the Southeast Missouri State Redhawks of Southeast Missouri State Universityfrom 1989 to 1999. He was assistant coach with the McNeese State Cowboys basketball team of McNeese State University team from 2002 to 2018.  Dumars joined the Lamar Cardinals basketball staff as an assistant coach in August, 2018.

References

External links
Just Sports Stats
College stats

Living people
1957 births
Players of American football from Louisiana
American football defensive backs
Canadian football defensive backs
African-American players of American football
African-American players of Canadian football
Louisiana–Monroe Warhawks football players
Montreal Alouettes players
Denver Gold players
Birmingham Stallions players
Southeast Missouri State Redhawks football coaches
McNeese Cowboys basketball coaches
Sportspeople from Natchitoches, Louisiana
21st-century African-American people
20th-century African-American sportspeople